Dolichoderus germaini is a species of ant in the genus Dolichoderus. Described by Emery in 1894, the species is endemic to Brazil, Mexico, Paraguay and Peru.

References

Dolichoderus
Hymenoptera of North America
Hymenoptera of South America
Insects described in 1894